"Law" is a single by American rapper Yo Gotti from his eighth studio album, The Art of Hustle  (2016), and features American rapper E-40. It was released on March 28, 2016, as the second single from the album. The song was produced by Big Fruit.

Music video
The music video for the single premiered on April 7, 2016, via Yo Gotti's VEVO channel. Stand-up comedian Lil Duval appears in the video.

In popular culture
In September 2016, the song was played in the second episode of comedy-drama television series Atlanta's first season.

Charts

Weekly charts

Year-end charts

Certifications

References

External links

2016 songs
2016 singles
Yo Gotti songs
E-40 songs
Epic Records singles